Dibaba is an Oromo name. Notable people with the surname include:

Tirunesh Dibaba, Ethiopian long-distance runner who has achieved multiple Olympic and World Championships gold medals and world records. She is the middle sister of Ejegayehu and Genzebe Dibaba.
Ejegayehu Dibaba, Ethiopian long-distance runner and 2004 Olympic silver medallist at 10,000 meters. She is the older sister of Tirunesh and Genzebe Dibaba.
Genzebe Dibaba, Ethiopian long-distance runner and 2015 1,500 meter World Champions gold medalist. She is the younger sister of Tirunesh and Ejegayehu Dibaba.
Mare Dibaba, Ethiopian marathon runner and 2015 World Championships marathon winner.

Oromo-language names